Only Lovers Left Alive is a 1964 dystopian fiction novel by Dave Wallis.  It describes a near-future society in which all adults have committed suicide and teenagers are able to run wild.  With its theme of youth in charge and out of control, the book hit a chord with the emerging counter-culture, and a film adaptation starring the Rolling Stones and directed by Nicholas Ray was planned in the mid-1960s.

Publication
Wallis was an English writer working as a supply teacher, with two previous novels, and he was in his late 40s when it came out.  After being rejected by his previous publisher Heinemann, Only Lovers Left Alive was published by Anthony Blond with a print run of 10,000 copies, high for a comparatively unknown author.  US paperback rights were sold for US$25,000.

Plot
All adults have committed suicide, and teenagers are left to their own devices.  Gangs war with each other, while more sensible teens try to establish a new society.

Response
The Observer praised the novel's first half for linking the teenagers' destructiveness to the violence of present-day society, but found it tended towards an adventure novel full of cliche and sensationalism. Kirkus said "characters are perfectly banal and the author's imagination pedestrian." The New York Times called the book's premise "irresistible".

Cultural influence

The novel gained a cultural importance, being viewed as a symbol of the rising power of teenagers in popular culture.  It was banned by Irish censors in 1966.

It was considered as a possible film project for the Rolling Stones in the mid-1960s, with Nicholas Ray possibly to direct in 1966.  Ray's involvement only lasted a few weeks of trans-Atlantic travel and press conferences.  According to Billboard, Andrew Loog Oldham and Allen Klein were to produce, and the band would receive US$1 million.

The novel lent its title to the 1981 album by The Wanderers, a new wave act featuring Stiv Bators and Dave Tregunna (both later of The Lords of the New Church), a The (International) Noise Conspiracy song, and a 2006 song by English band The Long Blondes. The Pet Shop Boys' 1993 song "Dreaming of the Queen" also references the novel's title, as does the 1976 Horslips song "Sword of Light." Marco Pirroni of Adam and the Ants named a record label after the book.  It is also reported as having been a favorite book of Doors singer Jim Morrison. A 2013 film directed by Jim Jarmusch appropriates the same title, but is not an adaptation of the Wallis novel. KMFDM’s 2017 album, Hell Yeah, features a song, “Only Lovers”, that mentions the title of the book in its chorus.

References

1964 British novels
British post-apocalyptic novels
Dystopian novels
Novels set in London
Fiction about suicide
Anthony Blond books